Milochori (before 1927: Λύγκα - Lygka) is a village in the Mouriki municipal unit, northern Kozani regional unit, West Macedonia, Greece. It is located 30 km east of Ptolemaida. It is situated at an altitude of 680 meters above sea level. The postal code is 50005, while the telephone code is +30 24630. At the 2011 census, the population was 582.

References

External links
 Agricultural Cooperative of Milochori

Populated places in Kozani (regional unit)